Rafael Nadal defeated Stefanos Tsitsipas in the final, 6–4, 6–7(6–8), 7–5 to win the singles title at the 2021 Barcelona Open. Nadal saved a championship point en route to his record-extending 12th Barcelona Open title and 61st ATP Tour singles title on clay. It became the second tournament at which Nadal had earned 12 or more victories, after the French Open. At three hours and 38 minutes, the final match was also the longest best-of-three-set tour-level final ever recorded since the Association of Tennis Professionals began tracking statistics in 1991. Tsitsipas, who had also lost to Nadal in his first career ATP singles final at this tournament in 2018, was in contention to win his first ATP 500 tournament title on his seventh attempt.

Dominic Thiem was the defending champion from when the tournament was last held in 2019, but he did not return to compete.

Seeds
All seeds receive a bye into the second round.

Draw

Finals

Top half

Section 1

Section 2

Bottom half

Section 3

Section 4

Qualifying

Seeds

Qualifiers

Lucky loser

Qualifying draw

First qualifier

Second qualifier

Third qualifier

Fourth qualifier

Fifth qualifier

Sixth qualifier

References

External links
 Main draw
 Qualifying draw

2021 ATP Tour